Sir Edward Marwood-Elton Q.C. (19 May 1800 – 1884) was an English barrister and Devonshire landowner who served as the High Sheriff of Devon in 1858.

Life  
Edward Marwood-Elton was born on the 19 May 1800. He was the son of James Marwood-Elton and Anne Storey, both of whom belonged to landed families of Devon.

In 1833, Marwood-Elton purchased the Widworthy Court estate in Devon and commissioned George Stanley Repton to design the replacement principal house. He continued to expand the estate through land acquisitions for the rest of his life.

Marwood-Elton died in 1884, unmarried and without issue. His heir was a cousin, William Elton (1865–1931), who took the surname Marwood-Elton.

References 

1800 births
1884 deaths
English barristers
19th-century English lawyers